Aeromachus pygmaeus, the pygmy scrub-hopper is a butterfly belonging to the family Hesperiidae. The species range is Nilgiris, Wynaad, Coorg, Kanara, Assam to Burma and Thailand.

Description

The larvae feed on Polytrias indica, Cyrtococcum trigonum, and Stenotaphrum secundatum.

References

p
Butterflies of Asia